

Club Records

Biggest Wins

Eels Biggest Losses

Biggest Wins vs Current NRL Clubs

Biggest Losses vs Current NRL Clubs

Biggest Wins vs Former Clubs

Biggest Losses vs Former Clubs

Streaks
Most Consecutive Wins
 12 Matches; 18 April - 24 July 1964
 12 Matches; 2 April - 26 June 1977

Most Consecutive Losses
 19 Matches; 24 May 1959 - 13 June 1960

Comebacks
Biggest Comeback

Recovered from a 22-point deficit.
Trailed Canberra 22-0 at halftime to win 30-22 at Parramatta Stadium (26 April 1987)

Worst Collapse

Surrendered a 24-point lead.
Lead North Queensland Cowboys 24-6 at halftime to lose 36-30 at Pirtek Stadium, Sydney (8 June 2015)

Tigers Up 31-0 with not much time on the clock and Parramatta Eels managed to get 5 converted tries to make the game 30-31. Parramatta Eels may not have won that game but a significant comeback to say the least and great for points for and against.

Individual Records

Most First Grade Games
330, Nathan Hindmarsh (1998–2012)
265, Brett Kenny (1980–1993)
264, Luke Burt (1999–2012)
259, Ray Price (1976–1986)
259, Nathan Cayless (1997–2010)
233, Tim Mannah (2009–2019)
228, Peter Sterling (1978–1992)
216, Mick Cronin (1977–1986)
204, Daniel Wagon (1999–2008)
202, Mark Laurie (1982–1992)
201, Fuifui Moimoi (2004–2014)

Most Tries In A Match
 5, Jamie Lyon against Cronulla Sharks at Parramatta Stadium (August 23, 2003), Parramatta won 74-4.
 4, Mitchell Wallace against Balmain Tigers at Parramatta Stadium (April 23, 1949), Parramatta won 20-6.
 4, Dick Thornett against Canterbury Bulldogs at Cumberland Oval (July 21, 1968), Parramatta won 48-9.
 4, Owen Stephens against South Sydney Rabbitohs at Redfern Oval (May 24, 1975), Parramatta lost 28-35.
 4, Ray Price against South Sydney Rabbitohs at Redfern Oval (August 13, 1978), Parramatta won 50-10.
 4, Eric Grothe Sr. against Canberra Raiders at Belmore Sports Ground (April 11, 1982), Parramatta won 54-3.
 4, Eric Grothe Sr. against Western Suburbs Magpies at Belmore Sport Ground (July 1, 1984), Parramatta won 46-12.
 4, Paul Taylor against Canberra Raiders at Parramatta Stadium (April 24, 1988), Parramatta won 40-12.
 4, Matt Petersen against South Sydney Rabbitohs at Parramatta Stadium (May 31, 2003), Parramatta won 28-4.
 4, Jarryd Hayne against Newcastle Knights at Parramatta Stadium (July 8, 2006), Parramatta won 46-12.
 4, Semi Radradra against St George Illawarra Dragons at WIN Stadium (March 12, 2017), Parramatta won 34-16.
 4, Semi Radradra against Brisbane Broncos at Suncorp Stadium (August 24, 2017), Parramatta won 52-34.
 4, Maika Sivo against North Queensland Cowboys at Bankwest Stadium (July 3, 2020), Parramatta won 42-4.

Most Goals In A Match
 11, Mick Cronin against Illawarra Steelers at Belmore Sports Ground (May 30, 1982)
 11, Jason Taylor against Wests Tigers at Leichhardt Oval (April 29, 2001)
 10, Brian Jones against Canterbury Bulldogs at Cumberland Oval (August 20, 1955)
 10, Mick Cronin against Newtown Jets at Henson Park (August 20, 1978)
 10, Clinton Schifcofske against Western Suburbs Magpies at Campbelltown Stadium (July 18, 19990
 10, Luke Burt against Penrith Panthers at Parramatta Stadium (March 17, 2002)

Most Points In A Match
 28 (2 tries, 10 goals), Luke Burt against Penrith Panthers at Parramatta Stadium (March 17, 2002), Parramatta won 64-6.
 28 (3 tries, 8 goals), Luke Burt against Canberra Raiders at Parramatta Stadium (August 28, 2005), Parramatta won 48-10.
 27 (3 tries, 9 goals), Mick Cronin against North Sydney Bears at North Sydney Oval (May 13, 1979), Parramatta won 48-17.
 27 (3 tries, 9 goals), Mick Cronin against Canberra Raiders at Belmore Sports Ground (April 11, 1982), Parramatta won 54-3.

(Mick Cronins' tallies in today's game would be 30 points in a game, as the value of a try was worth 3 points until the 1983 season)

Most Tries In A Season
 24, Semi Radradra in 2015
 23, Steve Ella in 1982
 22, Semi Radradra in 2017
 22, Maika Sivo in 2019
 21, Brett Kenny in 1983
 20, Neil Hunt in 1983
 19, Semi Radradra in 2014
 19, Bevan French in 2016

Most Tries For Club
124, Luke Burt (1999–2012)
113, Jarryd Hayne (2006–2014, 2018)
110, Brett Kenny (1980–1993)
94, Steve Ella (1979–1988)
82, Semi Radradra (2013–2017)
78, Ray Price (1976–1986)
78, Eric Grothe Sr. (1979–1989)
75, Mick Cronin (1977–1986)
71, Maika Sivo (2019– )
70, Clint Gutherson (2016– )

Most Points In A Season
 282 (16 tries, 117 goals) Mick Cronin in 1978
 279 (11 tries, 123 goals) Mick Cronin in 1982
 265 (8 tries, 116 goals, 1 field goal) Jason Taylor in 2001
 253 (15 tries, 104 goals) Mick Cronin in 1979
 226 (4 tries, 105 goals) Mick Cronin in 1983
 225 (7 tries, 101 goals, 2 field goals) Mick Cronin in 1977
 217 (15 tries, 77 goals, 3 field goals) Luke Burt in 2009
 214 (11 tries, 85 goals) Luke Burt in 2005
 204 (6 tries, 90 goals) Mick Cronin in 1985

Most Points For Club
1,971 (75 tries, 865 goals, 2 field goals), Mick Cronin (1977–1986)
1,793 (124 tries, 646 goals, 5 field goals), Luke Burt (1999–2012)
891 (24 tries, 394 goals, 7 field goals), Mitchell Moses (2017– )
548 (93 tries, 104 goals, 6 field goals), Steve Ella (1979–1988)
460 (24 tries, 194 goals), Arch Brown (1965–1969)
459 (113 tries, 2 goals, 3 field goals), Jarryd Hayne (2006–2014, 2018)
444 (21 tries, 180 goals) Clinton Schifcofske (1988-2000)
410 (110 tries) Brett Kenny (1980-1993)

Honours

Premierships

Runners-up

Minor Premierships (5/61)
1977, 1982, 1986, 2001, 2005

Finals Appearances (29/74)
1962, 1963, 1964, 1965, 1975, 1976, 1977, 1978, 1979, 1981, 1982, 1983, 1984, 1985, 1986, 1997{ARL}, 1998, 1999, 2000, 2001, 2002, 2005, 2006, 2007, 2009, 2017, 2019, 2020, 2021.

(Note: The 1986 Grand Final is the only tryless Grand Final up to date.)

Rothmans Medal winners
 Ray Higgs (1976)
 Mick Cronin (1977, 1978)
 Ray Price (1979)
 Peter Sterling (1987, 1990)

Clive Churchill Medal
 Peter Sterling (1986)

Dally M Awards

Dally M Medal winners
 Ray Price (1982)
 Peter Sterling (1986, 1987)
 Jarryd Hayne (2009, 2014*) - *co-winner

Dally M Fullback of the Year
Jarryd Hayne (2009, 2014)
Clinton Gutherson (2020)

Dally M Winger of the Year
Eric Grothe Jr (2005)
Jarryd Hayne (2007)
Semi Radradra (2014, 2015)

Dally M Centre of the Year
Mick Cronin (1980, 1981, 1983)
Steve Ella (1982, 1984, 1985)

Dally M Halfback of the Year
Peter Sterling (1983, 1984, 1986, 1987)
Mitchell Moses (2019)

Dally M Prop of the Year
Dean Pay (1998)

Dally M Hooker of the Year
Brad Drew (2001)

Dally M Second-Rower of the Year
Peter Wynn (1985)
Nathan Hindmarsh (2000, 2001, 2004, 2005, 2006)
Isaiah Papali'i (2021)

Dally M Lock of the Year
Ray Price (1982, 1983, 1984, 1985, 1986)
Jim Dymock (1996)
Jason Smith (1999)
Daniel Wagon (2001)

Dally M Rookie of the Year
David Liddiard (1983)
Michael Vella (1999)
Tim Smith (2005)
Jarryd Hayne (2006)

Dally M Coach of the Year
Jack Gibson (1982)
Brian Smith (2001)

Provan-Summons Medal
Nathan Hindmarsh (2005, 2006, 2007, 2008, 2011)
Clinton Gutherson (2017)

See also

List of NRL records

References

External links

Records
Sydney-sport-related lists
National Rugby League lists
Australian records
Rugby league records and statistics